Sharifuddin Pirzada NI (12 June 1923 – 2 June 2017) was a Pakistani Barrister who served as a senior advocate at the Supreme Court of Pakistan.

Personal life
Sharifuddin Pirzada was born in the city of Burhanpur, in what is today Madhya Pradesh, to parents Mir Niazi Pirzada and his wife, Fatima. His father was a noted barrister as well, serving in the Indian Civil Service at the time and posted in the state.

He died on 2 June 2017, aged 93.

Awards
Awarded Nishan-i-Imtiaz in 1998

Publications
Pakistan at a Glance, Bombay 1941.
Jinnah on Pakistan, Bombay 1943.
Leaders Correspondence with Jinnah.
Evolution of Pakistan, Karachi 1962 (also published in Urdu and Arabic).
Fundamental Rights and Constitutional Remedies in Pakistan, Lahore 1966.
The Pakistan Resolution and the historic Lahore Session. Islamabad 1970.
Foundation of Pakistan (3 volumes), 1971.
Some Aspects of Quaid-i-Azam's Life 1978.
Collected Works of Quaid-i-Azam Jinnah (3 volumes).
Dissolution of Constituent Assembly of Pakistan, Karachi 1985.

References

External links
http://www.pirzada.com
BBC Hardtalk interview of Syed Sharifuddin Pirzada

|-

|-

|-

1923 births
2017 deaths
Attorneys General of Pakistan
Foreign Ministers of Pakistan
International Law Commission officials
Organisation of Islamic Cooperation officials
Military government of Pakistan (1977–1988)
Muhajir people
Recipients of Nishan-e-Imtiaz
Pakistani anti-communists
Pakistani civil servants
Pakistani diplomats
Pakistani lawyers
Pakistani scholars
Pakistani officials of the United Nations
People from Lahore
Members of the International Law Commission